Pavlovo is a rural locality (a village) in Argunovskoye Rural Settlement, Nikolsky District, Vologda Oblast, Russia. The population was 78 as of 2002.

Geography 
Pavlovo is located 47 km northwest of Nikolsk (the district's administrative centre) by road. Ilyinskoye is the nearest rural locality.

References 

Rural localities in Nikolsky District, Vologda Oblast